The 2021 Down Senior Football Championship was the 113th official edition of Down GAA's premier Gaelic Football tournament for senior clubs in County Down. 16 teams competed with the winner representing Down in the Ulster Senior Club Football Championship. The tournament operated a double elimination format for the opening two rounds of the championship, with the winners and early round losers rejoining at the quarter final stage.

Kilcoo were the holders after defeating Carryduff in the 2020 final, and retained the title following their victory in the 2021 final against St Mary's Burren.

Team Changes

The following teams have changed division since the 2020 championship season.

To S.F.C.
Promoted from 2020 Down I.F.C.
 Saul (2020 Down Intermediate Football Champions)

From S.F.C.
Relegated to 2021 Down I.F.C.
 Darragh Cross (Lost 2020 Relegation Play-off)

 –

Participating Teams
The following teams take part in the 2021 edition of the Down Senior Football Championship. –

 Ballyholland Harps (semi-final)
 Bryansford (Round 2B)
 Burren (final)
 Carryduff (quarter-final)
 Clonduff (semi-final)
 Kilcoo (champions) 
 Loughinisland (Round 2B)
 Mayobridge (quarter-final)
 Rostrevor (Round 2B)
 Warrenpoint (Round 3)

 Bredagh (Round 3)
 Castlewellan (Round 3)
 Glenn (quarter-final)
 Longstone (Round 3)
 RGU Downpatrick (quarter-final)
 Saul (Round 2B)

Round 1
The 16 participating teams were placed into an open draw. Winning sides move to Round 2A while losing sides go into Round 2B.

Round 2

Round 2A
Round 2A will feature the eight winning sides from Round 1, with an open draw to determine the fixtures. The winning sides progress directly to the quarter final, with the losing sides moving into Round 3.

Round 2B
Round 2B sees the eight losing sides from Round 1 compete for a place in Round 3. The losing sides from this round will be eliminated from the competition.

Relegation Semi-finals
The 4 losers of Round 2B play each other in the Relegation Semi-finals. The 2 winners will secure their Senior status for 2022, while the 2 losers will face-off in the Relegation Final.

Relegation Final
The winner of the Relegation Final will maintain their Senior status into 2022, while the loser will be relegated to the 2022 Down I.F.C.

 Rostrevor relegated to 2022 Down Intermediate Football Championship

Round 3
Round 3 is a supplementary round for teams to have a second chance at reaching the quarter final. This round features teams that have lost once so far in this year's Championship, either winning in Round 1 and losing in Round 2A, or losing in Round 1 but winning their Round 2B fixture. Losing sides in this round are eliminated from this year's competition.

This round is seeded, meaning in each fixture a Round 2A losing side will face a Round 2B winning side.

Quarter-final
The quarter final sees the two brackets rejoin, with the earlier Round 2A winners facing a Round 3 winner for a Semi Final spot.

Semi-final
The semi final will see the four winning sides face off for a place in this year's final. This round is an open draw from the four Quarter Final winners.

Final
The final will be played between the two Semi Final winners, and will take place at Páirc Esler, Newry.

References

External links
 Down GAA

Down SFC
Down Senior Football Championship
Down Senior Football Championship